Hugh Fortescue, 1st Earl Clinton, 14th Baron Clinton (1696 – 1751) of Castle Hill in the parish of Filleigh, and of Weare Giffard Hall, both in North Devon, and of Ebrington Manor in Gloucestershire, was a landowner and peer. He built the surviving Palladian stately home of Castle Hill.

Origins
He was the eldest surviving son and heir of Hugh Fortescue, MP (1665–1719) of Filleigh, Weare Giffard and Ebrington, by his first wife Bridget Boscawen (d. 1708), daughter and sole heiress of Hugh Boscawen, MP (1625–1701), of Tregothnan in Cornwall (whose mother was a Rolle), by his wife Lady Margaret Clinton (d. 1688), the youngest daughter and eventual co-heiress of Theophilus Clinton, 4th Earl of Lincoln, 12th Baron Clinton (1600–1667). Bridget Boscawen's first cousin was Hugh Boscawen, 1st Viscount Falmouth (c. 1680-1734), Comptroller of the Household and Vice-Treasurer of Ireland, raised to the peerage in 1720. From the Boscawens the Fortescue family inherited various estates in Cornwall including antimony mines at Treore and also possessed Trewether and the harbours at Port Gaverne and Port Isaac.

14th Baron Clinton
On the death of his mother's childless first cousin Edward Clinton, 5th Earl of Lincoln, 13th Baron Clinton (d.1692) (grandson and heir of Theophilus Clinton, 4th Earl of Lincoln, 12th Baron Clinton (1600–1667)), the title Baron Clinton went into abeyance until it was terminated in 1721 in favour of Hugh Fortescue, who thus became 14th Baron Clinton. He also inherited Tattershall Castle in  Lincolnshire, the Clinton seat, which was retained by the Fortescue family until 1910.

Career
On 16 March 1721 he was summoned to the House of Lords as Baron Clinton and in the same year was appointed by King George I as Lord Lieutenant of Devon. In 1723 he was appointed a Gentleman of the Bedchamber to the Prince of Wales (the future King George II). In 1725 he was made a Knight of the Bath also by King George I. Having previously been a supporter of Prime Minister Walpole, in 1733 he voted against his Excise Bill, which having faced substantial opposition failed to pass, and was dismissed from his royal posts as Gentleman of the Bedchamber to King George II and Lord Lieutenant of Devon, as were also dismissed from their posts two dukes, four earls and two barons who had similarly defied Walpole. Following Walpole's resignation in 1742, Fortescue's career recovered and on 5 July 1746 he was elevated to the peerage as Baron Fortescue of Castle Hill (with special remainder) and Earl Clinton.

Estates

He consolidated his estates by selling most of his holdings in Somerset and Wiltshire and reinvesting the proceeds of £22,000 in purchasing more land in the vicinity of his North Devon manor of Filleigh, inherited from his father, where he demolished the ancient manor house and built in its place the surviving Palladian stately home which he named Castle Hill.

Personal life
He died unmarried on 3 May 1751, aged 55, although he had fathered a daughter by a mistress, for whom he built a house on his Filleigh estate. The illegitimate daughter married one of his cousins.

Succession
As he died without legitimate issue, the Earldom of Clinton became extinct and the Barony of Fortescue descended to his younger half-brother, Matthew Fortescue, 2nd Baron Fortescue (1719–1785) in accordance with the special remainder. The ancient barony of Clinton, which had been created by writ in 1298, went into abeyance until 1760 between his childless sister Margaret Fortescue (1693-1760), who styled herself "Baroness Clinton", and their second cousin Margaret Rolle (1709–1781), who in 1760 became 15th Baroness Clinton, the daughter of Col. Samuel Rolle (1646-1719), the son of Robert Rolle (d. 1660), MP, of Heanton Satchville, Petrockstowe, Devon, by his wife Lady Arabella Clinton, the younger daughter of Theophilus Clinton, 4th Earl of Lincoln, 12th Baron Clinton (1600–1667). Margaret Rolle was then the widow of Robert Walpole, 2nd Earl of Orford (d. 1751) (son of the Prime Minister Robert Walpole) and the wife of Sewallis Shirley, son of Robert Shirley, 1st Earl Ferrers.

References

|-

|-

Peers of Great Britain created by George II
Barons Clinton
Earls in the Peerage of Great Britain
Lord-Lieutenants of Devon
1696 births
1751 deaths